Rudi Coetzee (born 16 April 1981) is a South African rugby union player. His position is centre and he currently plays for FC Grenoble in the Top 14.

Career
He began his career with Lions in his native South Africa before moving to CS Bourgoin-Jallieu in 2006. He played with Bourgoin until January 2011. He joined USA Perpignan in January 2011, scoring six tries in the following season, before moving to newly promoted Grenoble in the summer of 2012.

References

1981 births
Living people
South African rugby union players
Sportspeople from Port Elizabeth
CS Bourgoin-Jallieu players
USA Perpignan players
FC Grenoble players
Rugby union centres
Golden Lions players
Lions (United Rugby Championship) players
Bulls (rugby union) players
Blue Bulls players
South African expatriate rugby union players
Expatriate rugby union players in France
South African expatriate sportspeople in France
South Africa international rugby sevens players